The 2011 Boys' U17 South American Volleyball Championship was the 1st edition of the tournament, organised by South America's governing volleyball body, the Confederación Sudamericana de Voleibol (CSV). It was held in Guayaquil, Ecuador from November 16 to 20, 2011.

Teams

Competition System
The competition system for the First Boys' U17 South American Championship consist of two rounds, the first round was a Round-Robin system. Each team plays once against each of the 7 remaining teams with each team playing two matches in a day against different teams.

According to the final ranking in the first round, the best four teams will play in the semifinals (1º VS 4º and 2º VS 3º), the winners will play for the Gold Medal while the losers will play for the Bronze Medal.

All matches in the preliminary round and the semifinals are played best out of three sets, the third place match and the Gold Medal match are played best out of 5 as normal senior tournaments.

Matches
All times are Ecuador Standard Time (UTC-5)

Standings

|}

Day 1

|}

Day 2

|}

Day 3

|}

Day 4

|}

Final round

5th/8th bracket

Championship bracket

5th to 8th classification

|}

Semifinals

|}

Seventh place match

|}

Fifth place match

|}

Bronze Medal match

|}

Gold Medal match

|}

Final standing

References

Men's South American Volleyball Championships
S
Volleyball
V
Volleyball in Ecuador